Broke & Famous: Still Broke the Mixtape is an album released by the reggaeton duo Ñejo & Dalmata in 2009.

Track listing
"Cuando La Calle Habla" (Ñejo feat. Various Artists)
"La Ando Buscando" (Ñejo & Dalmata)
"Olvídate De Eso" (Ñejo & Dalmata feat. Alexis & Fido)
"Salvaje" (Dalmata)
"Marihuana" (Ñejo)
"Vamos A Tirarnos A La Maroma" (feat. K-Mill)
"Algo Musical (Remix)" (Ñejo & Dalmata feat. Arcangel & Daddy Yankee)
"Ready To Fly" (Dalmata)
"Dímelo Pa’ Donde" (Ñejo & Dalmata feat. J-King, Maximan & Guelo Star)
"No Vuelva A Llorar" (Ñejo & Dalmata feat. Nano MC)
"Más Que A Mi Vida" (Ñejo & Dalmata feat. Cosculluela)
"Corazón Roto" (Ñejo)
"Voy A Hacertelo" (Ñejo & Dalmata feat. Naldo)
"Eso Que Tienes Tú" (Dalmata feat. Gustavo Laureano)
"Cayendo En Ti" (Ñejo & Dalmata feat. VR)
"Un Call (Remix)" (Ñejo & Dalmata feat. Falo, Chyno Nyno, Yomo & Jowell)
"Ando En La FJ" (Ñejo)
"Loca Con Su Tiguere" (Ñejo & Dalmata feat. Voltio & El Cata)
"Mix"
"Navidad" (Ñejo & Dalmata)

References

2008 albums
Reggaeton albums